Stachilis is a genus of jumping bristletails in the family Machilidae. There are at least three described species in Stachilis.

Species
These three species belong to the genus Stachilis:
 Stachilis catamachilideus (Stach, 1958)
 Stachilis drenowskii (Stach, 1958)
 Stachilis pectinata Janetschek, 1957

References

Further reading

 
 
 
 
 

Archaeognatha
Articles created by Qbugbot